The 2018–19 Lafayette Leopards men's basketball team represented Lafayette College during the 2018–19 NCAA Division I men's basketball season. The Leopards, led by 24th-year head coach Fran O'Hanlon, played their home games at the Kirby Sports Center in Easton, Pennsylvania as members of the Patriot League.

Previous season
The Leopards finished the 2017–18 season 10–21, 7–11 in Patriot League play to finish in seventh place. They defeated American in the first round of the Patriot League tournament before losing in the quarterfinals to Colgate.

Offseason

Departures

2018 recruiting class

2019 recruiting class

Roster

Schedule and results

|-
!colspan=9 style=| Non-conference regular season

|-
!colspan=9 style=| Patriot League regular season

|-
!colspan=9 style=| Patriot League tournament

Source

See also
2018–19 Lafayette Leopards women's basketball team

References

Lafayette Leopards men's basketball seasons
Lafayette
Lafayette
Lafayette